Jolt Cola is a carbonated soft drink produced by The Jolt Company, Inc. (later known as Wet Planet Beverages). The cola drink was created in 1985 by C. J. Rapp as a highly caffeinated beverage. It was targeted towards students and young professionals, stressing its use as a stimulant in a similar manner as energy drinks. Its slogan reads "All the sugar and twice the caffeine!"

History

Jolt Cola is a beverage originally made by The Jolt Company, Inc., of Rochester, New York. From the outset, Jolt's marketing strategy centered on the caffeine content, billing the drink as a means to promote wakefulness. The initial slogan was "All the sugar and twice the caffeine;" this slogan survived for 24 years. This slogan was changed to "Twice the Caffeine."

In the fall of 1987, the company began marketing a low calorie version, called Jolt 25, which was sweetened with a mixture of sugar and NutraSweet (a brand of aspartame), and had 25 calories per  can. Jolt Cola later diversified into additional flavors named Cherry Bomb, Citrus Climax, Orange Blast, White Lightning (grape), Red Eye, and Electric Blue.

In 2003, the name was licensed to a Hackensack, New Jersey, company named Gumrunners, Inc., which manufactures a line of caffeinated gum and mints bearing the Jolt label and the slogan "Chew More, Do More." The gum comes in two flavors: Spearmint and Icy Mint.

In 2006, Jolt Cola revamped its product line to Jolt Energy and changed its logo and packaging called "Jolt battery bottles" (that resemble the shape of a AA battery) which make a loud popping sound when opened. The cans are  resealable aluminum bottles; the body of the bottle was similar to that of a standard aluminum can, but the top had a twist-off aluminum cap with a plastic gasket liner, and in smaller "Quick Fix" cans ( single-use pull-tab aluminum cans, similar to those used for Red Bull) and "battery" cans ( resealable aluminum cans with the same twist-off top as the battery bottles). The Jolt Cola website claimed that the "Quick Fix" sizes were available at establishments that serve "adult beverages," for use as a mixer. The flavors of Jolt offered were also changed. Flavors offered were Cola, Blue Raspberry, Cherry Bomb (cherry cola), Silver (lemon-lime), Wild Grape, Orange Blast, Passionfruit (featuring a yellow can) and Ultra (a diet drink with Splenda as its artificial sweetener alongside guarana, ginseng, taurine, and vitamin B complex).

In 2008, the founder of The Jolt Company, C.J. Rapp sold controlling interest in the company to Emigrant Capital. In early 2009, the new owners removed C.J. Rapp as CEO of The Jolt Company. Later in 2009, the new owners filed for bankruptcy. C.J. Rapp and other shareholders had the bankruptcy filings overturned and dismissed from the courts. C.J. Rapp and another shareholder sued Emigrant Capital for breach of Fiduciary responsibility. After 8 years of litigation C.J. Rapp and Emigrant reached settlement terms that are undisclosed. 

In August 2017, Geek.com confirmed that Jolt Cola would return at Dollar General stores in September 2017. This version of Jolt Cola was produced for ECC Jolt, LLC, a New York City-based company. Jolt Cola ceased updating their social media outlets in March 2019; shortly thereafter, Dollar General stopped selling the product.

Jolt Energy
Since 2006, Jolt Cola and related flavors have been rebranded as Jolt Energy. Jolt Energy Drink comes in multiple flavors: Power Cola, Orange Burst, Wild Grape, Blue Bolt (blue raspberry), Blue Zero Carb, Cherry Bomb, Ultra and Silver. The company now also manufactures and markets a line of caffeinated chewing gums in various flavors. They are marketed under the brand-name Jolt Energy Gum.

Worldwide
Jolt Cola is also manufactured under license in Australia, Sweden and formerly (and briefly) in the United Kingdom and the Philippines. The German and Swedish supplier uses the old logos, branding and formulation, and only sells the original flavor. Jolt Cola is also available in the Netherlands and Finland. However, Jolt Cola Netherlands is a subsidiary of Jolt Cola Germany.

In Ireland, Jolt Cola was sold in  bottles in most Eurospars and Dunnes Stores. It was very popular at universities.

In Sweden and the Netherlands, Jolt Cola is heavily associated with LAN parties. Desperate fans of the drink paid 37.50kr (over US$4.00) per can when it was thought that Jolt would be discontinued in 2010.

In Australia, ("bottled under the authority of the Jolt Company Inc. by Jolt Corporation Australia Pty Ltd, 1 Barrpowell Rd Welland" South Australia) Jolt is sold in the traditional cola flavor, as well as lime, root beer, cream soda, and orange flavors. It generally comes in  bottles, with 190 mg of caffeine. With a caffeine concentration of 47 mg per 100 ml, these bottles contain 282 mg. For many years, Jolt has not been available (for example in capital cities such as Canberra or Brisbane); however the Jolt Cola Australian website has a shopping section and claims to deliver to the door; primarily 330mL bottle volumes in cases of fifteen bottles.

Jolt Cola was also available in Japan in the late 1980s and early 1990s, through the local distributorship of UCC Ueshima Coffee Co.

In the Philippines, Cosmos Bottling Corporation, makers of Sarsi and Pop Cola, entered into a licensing agreement in 1995 to manufacture and distribute Jolt Cola.  The license was terminated in 2001 after Cosmos was acquired by Coca-Cola Bottlers Philippines, Inc.

Jolt was redistributed after the formula was modified by RC Cola distributor Eduardo Sanchez and Victoria Lambert.

Legacy and influence
The Jolt Awards are annual awards given since 1991 by Dr. Dobb's Journal. The awards logo is modeled on the old Jolt Cola logo, and the awards ceremony has served Jolt Cola at the event.
Jolt Cola is also featured in the 1995 motion picture Hackers directed by Iain Softley. Two hosts of a pirate television broadcast claim to be sponsored by the beverage and advertise Jolt Cola as "the soft drink of the elite hacker."

References

External links

 

American cola brands
Caffeinated soft drinks
Dollar General
Products introduced in 1985
Products introduced in 2017
Products and services discontinued in 2010
Products and services discontinued in 2019